Marek Rygel (born 13 July 1989) is a Czech male canoeist who won 11 medals at senior level at the Wildwater Canoeing World Championships.

Medals at the World Championships
Senior

References

External links
 

1989 births
Living people
Czech male canoeists
Place of birth missing (living people)